Hubert Ng (Chinese: 黄宇哲; pinyin: Huáng Yǔ Zhé) is a Singaporean singer-songwriter and music producer.

Education
Hubert was educated at Catholic High School, Raffles Junior College and Singapore Management University.

Career
Hubert released his personal album in 2015, and it soared to #1 album on iTunes. He later flew to Taiwan to further his studies. While studying, he composed and produced for various notable artistes in the Mandopop industry.

Hubert rose to fame in 2017 after he wrote a song titled Ni Ni. The song topped Taiwan- originated music-streaming service KKBox's chart for more than a month last year, overtaking hits by Mandopop stars such as Jay Chou and Hebe Tien.

Hubert was invited and asked to write soundtracks for movies and television shows.

Accolades

Discography

External links
 Hubert Ng on Instagram
 Hubert Ng on YouTube

References

Living people
Singaporean musicians
Singaporean singer-songwriters
Singaporean record producers
Year of birth missing (living people)